Parata is a Māori surname. It is a transliteration of the English word "brother" or "brothers".

Prominent people with the surname Parata include:
Heke Parata, pseudonym of artist Shona Moller
Hekia Parata, politician
Katherine Te Rongokahira Parata, tribal leader
Matt Parata, Italian international rugby league player of Māori descent
Ned Parata, New Zealand rugby union administrator
Taare Parata, politician
Tame Parata, politician
Wiremu Parata, politician

See also
Wi Parata v. the Bishop of Wellington, New Zealand legal precedent

Māori-language surnames